WLAR (1450 AM, "Athens Greatest Hits") is a radio station broadcasting the Classic Hits format from Dial-Global. Licensed to Athens, Tennessee, United States, the station is currently owned by Randall W. Sliger, and features programming from ABC News and Motor Racing Network. Beginning February 2012, WLAR began simulcasting on Translator W235AZ 94.9 MHz, also licensed to Athens, Tennessee, through an agreement with owner The Lynn Family Trust (now W236DC). WLAR first began broadcasting in 1946.

References

External links

Classic hits radio stations in the United States
LAR
McMinn County, Tennessee